Spilosoma nigrocastanea is a moth in the family Erebidae. It was described by Walter Rothschild in 1917. It is found in Malawi.

Description

Female
Head and thorax fulvous yellow, the antennae black, the lower part of frons and palpi dark brown; abdomen orange with dorsal black spots on 2nd to 6th segments and quadrate patch on two terminal segments; pectus, legs, and ventral surface of abdomen black brown, the fore femora orange above. Forewing uniform fulvous yellow. Hindwing orange yellow with a broad black terminal hand except at tornus, its inner edge slightly irregular. Underside of forewing orange yellow with broad black-brown band on terminal area, arising below the costa, narrowing somewhat to inner margin and leaving the termen, very narrowly, and the cilia orange.

Wingspan 38 mm.

References

Diacrisia nigrocastanea at BHL
Spilosoma nigrocastanea at Markku Savela's Lepidoptera and Some Other Life Forms

Endemic fauna of Malawi
Moths described in 1917
nigrocastanea